Felimare kempfi is a species of sea slug, a dorid nudibranch, a shell-less marine gastropod mollusk in the family Chromodorididae.

Taxonomy
This species has previously been placed in the genera Chromodoris Alder & Hancock, 1855 and Mexichromis Bertsch, 1977. It was recently transferred to Felimare by Johnson & Gosliner in 2012.

Distribution 
Distribution of Felimare kempfi includes Florida, Mexico, Costa Rica, Venezuela, Brazil, Puerto Rico and Panama.

Description
The body is elongate, narrow, with the posterior portion of foot extending slightly beyond the mantle margin. Background color is bright blue with a thick yellow line around the mantle margin. There is a central white line and a series of large black and white spots extend down the dorsum. Rhinophores and gills are blue, branchial leaves are with black rachises. It is up to 20 mm long.

Ecology
Minimum recorded depth is 6 m. Maximum recorded depth is 37 m.

References
This article incorporates Creative Commons (CC-BY-4.0) text from the reference

Chromodorididae
Gastropods described in 1971
Taxa named by Eveline Du Bois-Reymond Marcus